Douglas Hastings Macarthur (1839 – 24 May 1892) was a 19th-century independent conservative Member of Parliament in the Manawatu region of New Zealand.

He represented the Manawatu electorate from 1884 to 1890, and then the Rangitikei electorate from 1890 to 1892, when he died. He briefly served as the mayor of Feilding in 1885, being elected unopposed following the resignation of Hugh L. Sherwill.

References

1839 births
1892 deaths
New Zealand MPs for North Island electorates
Members of the New Zealand House of Representatives
19th-century New Zealand politicians
Mayors of places in Manawatū-Whanganui